Centropages is a genus of copepods in the family Centropagidae with 34 known marine species.

Species 
 Centropages abdominalis Sato, 1913  
 Centropages aucklandicus Krämer, 1895  
 Centropages bradyi Wheeler, 1900  
 Centropages calaninus (Dana, 1849)  
 Centropages caribbeanensis Park, 1970  
 Centropages chierchiae Giesbrecht, 1889  
 Centropages elegans Giesbrecht, 1895  
 Centropages elongata  
 Centropages elongatus Giesbrecht, 1896  
 Centropages furcatus (Dana, 1852)  
 Centropages gracilis (Dana, 1849)  
 Centropages hamatus (Lilljeborg, 1853)  
 Centropages kroeyeri Giesbrecht, 1892  
 Centropages orsinii Giesbrecht, 1889  
 Centropages typicus Krøyer, 1849  
 Centropages velificatus (Oliveira, 1947)  
 Centropages violaceus (Claus, 1863)  
 Centropages yamadai

References

External links 
 
 

Centropagidae
Copepod genera
Taxa named by Henrik Nikolai Krøyer